Crotonic acid ((2E)-but-2-enoic acid) is a short-chain unsaturated carboxylic acid, described by the formula CH3CH=CHCO2H.  It is called crotonic acid because it was erroneously thought to be a saponification product of croton oil. It crystallizes as colorless needles from hot water. The cis-isomer of crotonic acid is called isocrotonic acid.  Crotonic acid is soluble in water and many organic solvents. Its odor is similar to butyric acid.

Production
Crotonic acid may be obtained by several methods:
by oxidation of crotonaldehyde:

by Knoevenagel condensation of acetaldehyde with malonic acid in pyridine:

or by alkaline hydrolysis of allyl cyanide after the intramolecular rearrangement of the double bond:

Furthermore, it is  formed during the distillation of 3-hydroxybutyric acid:

Properties
The unit cell contains four formula units.

Reactions
Crotonic acid converts into butyric acid by hydrogenation or by reduction with zinc and sulfuric acid.

Upon treatment with chlorine or bromine, crotonic acid converts to 2,3-dihalobutyric acids:

Crotonic acid adds hydrogen bromide to form 3-bromobutyric acid. 

The reaction with alkaline potassium permanganate solution affords 2,3-dihydroxybutyric acid.

Upon heating with acetic anhydride, crotonic acid converts to the acid anhydride:

Esterification of crotonic acid using sulfuric acid as a catalyst provides the corresponding crotonate esters:

Crotonic acid reacts with hypochlorous acid to 2-chloro-3-hydroxybutyric acid. This can either be reduced with sodium amalgam to butyric acid, can form with sulfuric acid 2-chlorobutenoic acid, react with hydrogen chloride to 2,3-dichlorobutenoic acid or with potassium ethoxide to 3-methyloxirane-2-carboxylic acid.

Crotonic acid reacts with ammonia at the alpha position in the presence of mercury(II) acetate. This reaction provides -threonine.

Use
Crotonic acid is mainly used as a comonomer with vinyl acetate.  The resulting copolymers are used in paints and adhesives.

Crotonyl chloride reacts with N-ethyl-2-methylaniline (N-ethyl-o-toluidine) to provide crotamiton, which is used as an agent against scabies.

Safety
Its  is 1 g/kg (oral, rats). It irritates eyes, skin, and respiratory system.

See also 
 Crotyl
 Crotyl alcohol
 Isocrotonic acid
 Methacrylic acid

References 

Enoic acids
Crotyl compounds